Djibloho, officially the Administrative City of Djibloho, (Spanish: Ciudad administrativa de Djibloho)  is the newest province of Equatorial Guinea, formally established by law in 2017. The administrative city was initially carved out of Añisok, a district in Wele-Nzas, on 1 August 2015, and was created to eventually replace Malabo as Equatorial Guinea's future national capital.

Administration

Djibloho comprises two urban districts, Ciudad de la Paz and Mbere. The capital is Ciudad de la Paz ("City of Peace"), known as Oyala until 2017. In the 2017 national parliamentary election, Djibloho elected one senator and one deputy.

References

 
States and territories established in 2017
2017 establishments in Equatorial Guinea
Provinces of Equatorial Guinea